Eric John Liddell  (10 August 1924 – 28 April 1991) was an Australian-born Hong Kong international lawn and indoor bowler.

Bowls career
Liddell was born in Bairnsdale, Victoria, on 10 August 1924, to Edward and Victoria Liddell. He served for four and a half years during the Second World War. He emigrated to Hong Kong in 1951 and represented Hong Kong at the 1954 British Empire and Commonwealth Games and competing in six consecutive Commonwealth Games from 1954 until 1978.

He won the gold medal in the pairs with Saco Delgado at the 1972 World Outdoor Bowls Championship in Worthing and eight years later was part of the fours team that won the gold medal at the 1980 World Outdoor Bowls Championship in Melbourne. In between he won the pairs gold once again with Saco Delgado at the 1978 Commonwealth Games.

Following the 1980 World Championships Liddell retired from bowls and returned to live in Australia residing on the Gold Coast.

Personal life and death
He was a chief assistant engineer by trade for the Hong Kong Telephone Company. Liddell later returned to Australia. He died in Queensland on 28 April 1991, at the age of 66.

Awards
In the 1975 New Year Honours, Liddell was appointed a Member of the Order of the British Empire, for services to the blind in Hong Kong. He was senior vice president of the Hong Kong Lawn Bowls Association.

References

1924 births
1991 deaths
Bowls World Champions
Hong Kong male bowls players
Australian male bowls players
Commonwealth Games gold medallists for Hong Kong
Bowls players at the 1954 British Empire and Commonwealth Games
Bowls players at the 1958 British Empire and Commonwealth Games
Bowls players at the 1962 British Empire and Commonwealth Games
Bowls players at the 1970 British Commonwealth Games
Bowls players at the 1974 British Commonwealth Games
Bowls players at the 1978 Commonwealth Games
Commonwealth Games medallists in lawn bowls
Members of the Order of the British Empire
Australian emigrants to Hong Kong
Medallists at the 1978 Commonwealth Games
Medallists at the 1954 British Empire and Commonwealth Games